José de Jesús Castillo is a Mexican paralympic powerlifter. He participated at the 2016 Summer Paralympics in the powerlifting competition, being awarded the bronze medal in the men's 97 kg event. De Jesús Castillo also competed in the powerlifting at the 2020 Summer Paralympics.

References

External links 
Paralympic Games profile

Living people
Place of birth missing (living people)
Year of birth missing (living people)
Mexican male weightlifters
Powerlifters at the 2016 Summer Paralympics
Medalists at the 2016 Summer Paralympics
Powerlifters at the 2020 Summer Paralympics
Paralympic medalists in powerlifting
Paralympic bronze medalists for Mexico
Paralympic powerlifters of Mexico
21st-century Mexican people